Chironomus plumosus, also known as the buzzer midge, is a species of nonbiting midge (Chironomidae) that occurs throughout areas in the Northern Hemisphere.

Description

Adult
Males have feathery antennae, while females' antennae are sleek. A dark brown band is seen at the end of each abdominal segment. Adults of the sibling species C. muratensis and C. nudiventris cannot be distinguished from C. plumosus based on morphological characters.

Immature
The larvae are called bloodworms because some larvae are bright red, but they can also be found in brown and almost black. When the larva pupate, they drift towards the surface, making them vulnerable to many types of fish. Other common predators include the common backswimmer (Notonecta glauca), common pondskater (Gerris lacustris), common toad (Bufo bufo), lesser water boatman (Corixa punctata), dragonflies, damselflies, great crested newt (Triturus cristatus), great diving beetle (Dytiscus marginalis), redstart (Phoenicurus phoenicurus), smooth newt (Triturus vulgaris), water scorpion (Nepa cinerea) and other midges such as Anatopynia plumipes.

Lifecycle
During the spring and summer, males create mating swarms which people can find quite a nuisance, though adults do not bite or feed. Females  lay egg masses in water where the egg mass will grow and sink to the bottom. The larvae stay at the bottom in silken tubes. The larvae feed on organic material such as organic debris and algae.

References

External links
BioLib

Chironomidae
Insects of the United States
Diptera of North America
Flies described in 1758
Taxa named by Carl Linnaeus